The 2017–18 international cricket season was from September 2017 to April 2018. 28 Test matches, 93 One Day Internationals (ODIs), and 44 Twenty20 Internationals (T20Is) were played during this period. Out of the 30 Test matches that were played four were day/night matches. The day/night Test match between South Africa and Zimbabwe was scheduled to last for only four days in duration, with the last such four-day Test match being played in 1973. The season started with India leading the Test cricket rankings, South Africa leading the ODI rankings, New Zealand leading the Twenty20 rankings, and England women leading the women's rankings. Additionally, the Laws of Cricket 2017 Code came into effect on 1 October 2017, superseding the 6th Edition of the 2000 Code of Laws, with many of the changes in the laws being incorporated into the ICC Standard Playing Conditions. 

The season started with Australia's tour of India, which consisted of 5 ODIs and 3 T20Is. After this, 16 more bilateral series among the full member nations were scheduled for the remainder of the season. The most notable of these series was the 70th edition of The Ashes, which was held in Australia from November 2017 to January 2018. Other notable highlights included New Zealand beating England in a home Test series for the first since 1984 and South Africa beating Australia in a home Test series since 1970. Australia's tour of South Africa was also notable for the many disciplinary issues that occurred throughout, with the most serious of these incidents being a ball tampering scandal that resulted in Australian captain Steve Smith, vice captain David Warner, and Cameron Bancroft being suspended from international cricket for 12 months, 12 months, and 9 months respectively. In addition, the first two T20I Tri-Series (Trans-Tasman Tri-Series and the Nidahas Trophy) among Full Member nations ever were conducted. 

The culmination of the 2019 ICC Cricket World Cup qualification process occurred in this season. The start of this season marked the cut off date for direct qualification for the World Cup from the ICC ODI Championship. The top eight teams at the cut off date gained direct qualification to the World Cup while the bottom four teams (West Indies, Zimbabwe, Ireland, Afghanistan) went into the 2018 Cricket World Cup Qualifier. These four teams were joined by the top four teams of the World Cricket League Championship and the top two teams of the World Cricket League Division Two to make up the ten teams that played in the World Cup Qualifier. 

The final two rounds (rounds 6 and 7) of the World Cricket League Championship concluded in this season, with the top 4 teams (Netherlands, Scotland, Papua New Guinea, Hong Kong) qualifying for the 2018 Cricket World Cup Qualifier. In addition, the Netherlands gained One Day International Status by winning the World Cricket League Championship and qualified for the 2020–23 ICC Cricket World Cup Super League. The bottom four teams (Kenya, Nepal, United Arab Emirates, Namibia) were relegated to World Cricket League Division Two for a chance to qualify for the final two spots of the World Cup Qualifier. These four teams were joined by Canada and Oman, the top two placed teams in the World Cricket League Division Three. The United Arab Emirates and Nepal finished in the top two and thus qualified for the World Cup Qualifier while Oman and Kenya finished in the bottom two and were relegated to Division Three. In the World Cup Qualifier, West Indies and Afghanistan were the top two finishers and thus qualified for the World Cup. 

In addition, the Intercontinental Cup concluded during this season, with matches in rounds 6 and 7 played in this period. Afghanistan won the tournament after finishing at the top of the table with the most points. 

Finally, the qualification process for the 2020 ICC T20 World Cup got underway with the Americas Southern Sub Region Qualifier, which saw Bermuda and Cayman Islands qualify for the Americas Regional Qualifier. The Asia Western Sub Region Qualifier was also conducted, with the UAE, Qatar, and Kuwait qualifying for the Asia Regional Qualifier. The Africa North-Western Sub Region Qualifier saw Ghana and Nigeria qualify for the Africa Region Qualifier.

Season overview

Rankings

The following are the rankings at the beginning of the season:

September

Australia in India

Netherlands in Zimbabwe

Sri Lanka vs Pakistan in United Arab Emirates

Bangladesh in South Africa

October

Scotland in Papua New Guinea

Netherlands vs Kenya in South Africa

Sri Lanka women in West Indies

Nepal in Hong Kong

Afghanistan in Hong Kong

West Indies in Zimbabwe

England women in Australia

New Zealand in India

New Zealand women vs Pakistan in United Arab Emirates

November

Sri Lanka in India

England in Australia

Scotland vs Papua New Guinea in United Arab Emirates

Hong Kong vs Papua New Guinea in United Arab Emirates

Afghanistan in United Arab Emirates

Namibia vs Netherlands in United Arab Emirates

Ireland vs Scotland in United Arab Emirates

December

West Indies in New Zealand

Ireland vs Afghanistan in United Arab Emirates

Kenya vs Scotland in United Arab Emirates

Nepal in United Arab Emirates

Zimbabwe in South Africa

January

India in South Africa

Pakistan in New Zealand

2017–18 United Arab Emirates Tri-Nation Series

2018 Under-19 Cricket World Cup

2017–18 Bangladesh Tri-Nation Series

Sri Lanka in Bangladesh

February

2017–18 Trans-Tasman Tri-Series

Afghanistan vs Zimbabwe in United Arab Emirates

India women in South Africa

2018 ICC World Cricket League Division Two

Final standings

England in New Zealand

March

Australia in South Africa

2018 Cricket World Cup Qualifier

Group stage

Super Sixes

Final standings

West Indies women in New Zealand

2018 Nidahas Trophy

Australia women in India

Pakistan women in Sri Lanka

2017–18 India women's Tri-Nation Series

April

West Indies in Pakistan

England women in India

References

2017 in cricket
2018 in cricket